"Emigrante del Mundo" is the debut single by Lucenzo. It was released in France initially in 2007 and a second time in 2010 after the success of the kuduro music promoted by Lucenzo's newer hits. The song appears on his debut album of the same name, released in 2011.

Track list
"Emigrante del Mundo" (radio version) (3:14)
"Emigrante del Mundo" (instrumental) (3:17)

References

2007 debut singles
2010 singles
Lucenzo songs
2007 songs
Songs written by Lucenzo